General elections were held in Islamabad Capital Territory on Thursday
10 October 2002 to elect 2 members of National Assembly of Pakistan from Islamabad.

Pakistan People's Party and Muttahida Majlis-e-Amal both won 1 seat from Islamabad by the margin of 11,590 and 17,868 votes respectively.

Candidates 
Total no of 28 Candidates including 8 Independents contested for 2 National Assembly Seats from Islamabad.

Result 

Party Wise

Constituency wise

References 

2002 elections in Pakistan
General elections in Pakistan